Decio Termisani (15651600) was an Italian painter of the late-Renaissance. He was born in Naples, and studied there first under Giovanni Filippo Criscuolo, and then under Pittone and Marco Pino. He painted a Last supper (1597) for the church of Santa Maria a Piazza.

References

1565 births
1600 deaths
16th-century Neapolitan people
16th-century Italian painters
Italian male painters
Painters from Naples
Italian Mannerist painters